John Davison Barnsdale (24 May 1878 – 5 August 1960) was an English cricketer and footballer. He was a right-handed batsman and wicket-keeper who played for Nottinghamshire.

Born in Arnold, Nottinghamshire, Barnsdale was educated at Nottingham High School, Sedbergh School and Trinity Hall, Cambridge. He played club cricket with Nottingham Forest CC and Magdala CC. He also played 25 matches in the Football League First Division as a half-back for Nottingham Forest in 1904 and 1905. He was a director of the Raleigh Bicycle Company and served as a major in the Lancashire Fusiliers.

Barnsdale made just one first-class appearance, against Oxford University at the University Parks on 8 June 1905. He scored a duck in the first innings of the match and ten runs in the second, and took one stumping. His first-innings dismissal came courtesy of William Evans, for whom Barnsdale's wicket was one of a hat-trick.

Barnsdale was a tailend batsman.

He became a farmer when he moved to Frensham, Surrey, where he retired. He died on 5 August 1960 in Lower Bourne, Farnham, Surrey at the age of 82 years.

References

External links

1878 births
1960 deaths
English cricketers
Nottinghamshire cricketers
People from Arnold, Nottinghamshire
Footballers from Nottinghamshire
Cricketers from Nottinghamshire
People educated at Nottingham High School
People educated at Sedbergh School
Alumni of Trinity Hall, Cambridge
Lancashire Fusiliers officers
English footballers
Nottingham Forest F.C. players
English Football League players
Association football wing halves
Wicket-keepers